The Prairie County Courthouse of Des Arc, Arkansas is one of two county courthouses in Prairie County, Arkansas.  Des Arc is one of two county seats, and De Valls Bluff, the other also has a courthouse.  The one in Des Arc is located downtown, at Court Square and 2nd Streets.  It is a handsome two-story brick building with Georgian and Italian Revival features, designed and built in 1913, after the city's second county courthouse was destroyed by fire.  It was designed by R.P. Morrison and cost $27,500.

The building was listed on the National Register of Historic Places in 1977.

Gallery

See also

National Register of Historic Places listings in Prairie County, Arkansas

References

Courthouses on the National Register of Historic Places in Arkansas
Colonial Revival architecture in Arkansas
Renaissance Revival architecture in Arkansas
Government buildings completed in 1913
County courthouses in Arkansas
Buildings and structures in Prairie County, Arkansas
1913 establishments in Arkansas
National Register of Historic Places in Prairie County, Arkansas